Remembrances may refer to:

 Remembrances (David Murray album), 1991
 Remembrances (The Lucy Show album), 2011

See also
Remembrance (disambiguation)